Betioky is a town in Atsimo-Andrefana Region, Madagascar and is crossed by the Route nationale 10. The population is 25,612 inhabitants in 2018.

An airport serves the town.

Betioky belongs to the poorest regions of Madagascar, where no facilities for tapped drinking water exist.

Nature
The Beza Mahafaly Reserve lies approx. 35 km North-East of Betioky Sud.

Religion
EEM - Eklesia Episkopaly Malagasy (Anglican Church of Madagascar)

Mining
The Betioky mine, an iron ore deposit.

References

Populated places in Toliara Province